Cedarville Airport  is a public airport located two miles (3.2 km) north of Cedarville, serving Modoc County, California, United States. It is mostly used for general aviation.

Facilities 

 Runway 1/19: 4,415 x 50 ft (1,346 x 15 m), surface: asphalt

References

External links 

Airports in Modoc County, California